Thomas Patrick McKenna (7 September 1929 – 13 February 2011) was an Irish actor, born in Mullagh, County Cavan. He had an extensive stage and screen career.

Career

Early years
Thomas Patrick McKenna was born at Mullagh, County Cavan, Ireland, in 1929 and educated at Mullagh School and St Patrick's College, Cavan. He was the eldest of ten children of Raphael McKenna, an auctioneer and merchant, and his wife Mae. There he became a protégé of Fr. Vincent Kennedy, who featured him in the annual productions of Gilbert & Sullivan operas.  He was a noted treble and sang in Cavan Cathedral, but later would also become a keen member of the school's Gaelic Football squad, representing St Patrick's in the final of the All Ireland colleges competition in 1948.

After leaving school he joined the Ulster Bank in Granard, Co Longford, and worked in banking for the next five years.  However, he remained set on becoming an actor and when he received a posting to Dublin he soon made a mark on the city's amateur scene appearing with the Rathmines and Rathgar Musical Society, and the Dublin Shakespeare Society. His employers were not impressed by his extracurricular activities, and in 1953 he was posted to the remote town of Killeshandra in County Cavan.  McKenna refused to go and resigned his position.

Stage

McKenna made his stage debut at the Pike Theatre in Dublin in 1953 as John Buchanan in Tennessee Williams' Summer and Smoke. He played a season at the Gaiety Theatre with Anew McMaster's Shakespearean company, and was a member of The Gas Theatre Company directed by Godfrey Quigley.

Through family contacts, he sought an interview with the managing director of the Abbey Theatre, Ernest Blythe.  Despite Blythe's concerns that "his nose was too long, and he would grow fat", he eventually became a permanent member of the company in 1954 and would remain there for the next eight years, performing over seventy roles.

In 1963, he secured a short leave of absence to go to London (St. Martin's Theatre) with the Gate Theatre's production of Stephen D, an adaptation of Joyce's A Portrait of the Artist as a Young Man by Hugh Leonard which had been a hit of the 1962 Dublin Theatre Festival.  The play was well received by the London critics, leading to offers of further other stage work there including "O'Keefe" in J. P. Donleavy's The Ginger Man (Ashcroft, Croydon), Lindsay Anderson's revival of Julius Caesar (1964) for the English Stage Company and 1965 as the Burglar (Aubrey "Popsy" Bagot) in Shaw's Too True to be Good (Garrick) opposite Alistair Sim and George Cole.

He had not left the Irish stage behind entirely however and would make regular appearances at the Dublin Theatre Festival in A Little Winter Love, Pull Down A Horseman, King of the Castle and Who's Afraid of Virginia Woolf.

He joined Stuart Burge's company at the Nottingham Playhouse in 1968 playing Trigorin in The Seagull and Sir Joseph Surface in Sheridan's The School For Scandal, both directed by Jonathan Miller. In 1969, he created the role of Fitzpatrick in David Storey's The Contractor directed by Lindsay Anderson at the Royal Court Theatre, London.  The production later transferred to the Fortune Theatre and ran for over a year. In 1973, he took on the role of Andrew Wyke opposite his friend Donal Donnelly in the Irish premiere of Peter Shaffer's Sleuth. The production played to acclaim at the Opera House, Cork, and at the Olympia Theatre in Dublin where it broke box office records.

Later that year he joined the Royal Shakespeare Company and took over the role of Robert Hand in James Joyce's only play, Exiles directed by Harold Pinter. In the same season he also appeared in a rare staging of Jean Genet's The Balcony directed by Terry Hands.

He returned to the RSC in 1976 for Shaw's The Devil's Disciple, directed by Jack Gold in a production to mark the American bicentennial celebrations, as the revolutionary pastor Reverend Anthony Anderson.

In the late 1980s and 1990s, he returned to the Dublin stage when he was invited by director Michael Colgan to join the Gate Theatre on a number of occasions, including admired productions of Uncle Vanya, The Cherry Orchard and No Man's Land. It was there he created the role of Dr Rice in Brian Friel's drama, Molly Sweeney (1994), and again at London's Almeida Theatre. Other Friel productions he appeared in were The Communication Cord (Hampstead Theatre, 1984) and Aristocrats (2004) at the RNT in his final stage appearance.

McKenna directed on occasion, and had to his name productions of John Millington Synge's The Playboy of the Western World (Nottingham Playhouse, 1968), Thomas Kilroy's The Death and Resurrection of Mr Roche (Abbey Theatre, 1973) and Seán O'Casey's The Shadow of A Gunman (Crucible Theatre, Sheffield, 1980).

Film and television
During the 1960s and 1970s, McKenna appeared regularly in popular television dramas, including The Avengers (1964, 1965, 1968), Danger Man (1965), The Saint (1966, 1968), Adam Adamant Lives! (1967), Jason King (1972), two episodes of Thriller (1973 and 1976), The Sweeney (1975), Blake's 7 (1978), Minder (1984) and Doctor Who (the serial The Greatest Show in the Galaxy (1988–89)).

He played Richmond in the Thames Television series Callan (1972) and made ten appearances in Crown Court (1974–1982), mainly as barrister Patrick Canty, while also appearing in the popular ATV anthology drama series Love Story (1965–1968). He also featured prominently in other television dramas including The Duchess of Malfi (1972), Napoleon and Love (1974), The Changeling (1974), Fathers and Families (1977), Holocaust (1978), the Blake's 7 episode "Bounty" (1978), The Manions of America (1981), To the Lighthouse (1983), The Scarlet and the Black (1983), Bleak House (1985), Strong Medicine (1986), The Play on One: Unreported Incident (1988), Jack the Ripper (1988), Shoot to Kill (1990), TV series Lovejoy - Irish Stew (1993), and the final episode of Inspector Morse - The Remorseful Day (2000).

He had prominent film roles in Ulysses (1967), and A Portrait of the Artist As A Young Man (1977).  Other film credits include The Charge of the Light Brigade (1968), Anne of the Thousand Days (1969), Perfect Friday (1970), Villain (1971), Straw Dogs (1971), All Creatures Great and Small (1975), Memed, My Hawk (1984), Pascali's Island (1988), A Caribbean Mystery (1989), Monarch (2000) and The Libertine (2004).

He narrated the Emmy award-winning documentary on the life of James Joyce Is There One Who Understands Me (RTÉ).

His performance as Henry VIII in the film Monarch was re-released in cinemas in 2014.

Radio and Audiobooks
McKenna's wonderfully rich voice featured in over thirty original drama productions for the BBC and the World Service along with readings of short stories and poetry for a variety of programmes.  He took the role of Phonsie Doherty in Christopher FitzSimon's Radio 4 comedy series, Ballylenon, and later appeared opposite David Threlfall in the radio drama Baldi.  On CD and download he has recorded the audiobooks poetry of W. B. Yeats, Joyce's short story collection Dubliners and Somerville and Ross's Tales of an Irish R.M.

Personal life
McKenna was married to May White, literally the girl next door, from 1956 until her death in 2007. They had five children.

Death
McKenna died on 13 February 2011 at the Royal Free Hospital in Hampstead, London, at the age of 81 following a long period of illness. He was buried alongside his wife at  Cemetery in his native County Cavan.

Following his death, tributes were paid by President of Ireland Mary McAleese, Prince Charles, and Ireland's Culture Minister Mary Hanafin, who said that McKenna was "one of a great generation whose talents on the screen and stage both at home and abroad gave us all great pride in his accomplishments". In County Cavan, he is commemorated by the T. P. McKenna Drama Scholarships (VEC) and the T. P. McKenna Perpetual Trophy presented as part of the Millrace Annual Drama Festival.

Selected filmography 

 1959 Broth of a Boy as Holmes
 1959 Home Is the Hero as Young Man At Dance
 1959 Shake Hands with the Devil as Unknown (uncredited)
 1960 A Terrible Beauty as A McIntyre Boy (uncredited)
 1960 The Siege of Sidney Street as Lapidos
 1960 Das schwarze Schaf as (uncredited)
 1961 Freedom to Die as Mike
 1961 Johnny Nobody as Officer Garda
 1964 Girl with Green Eyes as The Priest
 1964 Ferry Cross the Mersey as Jack Hanson
 1965 Young Cassidy as Tom
 1967 Ulysses as Buck Mulligan
 1968 The Charge of the Light Brigade as William Russell
 1969 Anne of the Thousand Days as Sir Henry Norris
 1970 The Beast in the Cellar Chief Superintendent Paddick
 1970 The Fifth Day of Peace as Nick
 1970 Perfect Friday as Smith
 1971 Straw Dogs Major John Scott
 1971 Villain as Frank Fletcher
 1971 Percy as Meet The People Compere
 1973 A Warm December as Minor Role (uncredited)
 1974 Percy's Progress as London News Editor
 1975 All Creatures Great and Small as Soames
 1975 Looking For Clancy as Marcus Selby
 1977 A Portrait of the Artist as a Young Man as Simon Dedalus
 1980 The Outsider as John Russell
 1980 Silver Dream Racer as Bank Manager
 1982 Britannia Hospital as Theatre Surgeon
 1984 Memed, My Hawk as Dursan 
 1985 The Doctor and the Devils as O'Connor
 1988 The Play on One: Unreported Incident as Michael Flynn
 1988 Pascali's Island as Dr. Hogan
 1988 Jack the Ripper as O'Connor
 1988 Red Scorpion as General Oleg Vortek
 1989 Valmont as Baron
 2000 Monarch as Henry VIII
 2000 Longitude as Edmund Burke
 2002 The Boys from County Clare as The Announcer
 2004 The Libertine as Black Rod

References

External links

 'T. P. McKenna – Official website'
 Daily Telegraph obituary
 The Guardian obituary 
 The Independent obituary

1929 births
2011 deaths
Irish male film actors
Irish male radio actors
Irish male stage actors
Irish male television actors
People from County Cavan
People educated at St Patrick's College, Cavan